Provincial Road 221 (PR 221) is a provincial road in the Rural Municipality of Rosser, Manitoba, Canada.  It runs northwest, from the junction of CentrePort Canada Way (PTH 190) and Sturgeon Road (near R.M.'s boundary with the City of Winnipeg) to the community of Marquette, alongside the main Canadian Pacific Railway line.   PR 221 and the rail line share a grade-separated crossing at the Perimeter Highway (PTH 101). 

Between PTH 190 and the Perimeter Highway, PR 221 has been incorporated into the CentrePort Canada road network.  As such, it has recently received upgrades and now has RTAC status, allowing for full tractor-trailer access  between PTH 190 and PTH 101.  Prior to the construction of CentrePort Canada Way, PR 221 linked with Inkster Boulevard (Winnipeg Route 25). Until the 1980s, PR 221 previously extended west of Marquette to PTH 26 along with is now Jubilee Road.

References

External links 
Manitoba Official Map

221